The Joseph Beale House is a historic residence located at 2301 Massachusetts Avenue, Northwest, Washington, D.C., in the Embassy Row neighborhood.  It was added to the National Register of Historic Places on May 8, 1973.

History
The residence was built between 1907 and 1909 by Washington architect Glenn Brown, who designed several buildings along Massachusetts Avenue. Designed for Mr. and Mrs. Joseph Beale, Brown used 18th century Romanesque Revival architecture for his design. In November 1928, Margaret K.C. Brown sold the residence to the government of Egypt for $150,000. Since then, it has served as the official residence of the Egyptian ambassador to the United States.

References

Embassy Row
Houses on the National Register of Historic Places in Washington, D.C.
Individually listed contributing properties to historic districts on the National Register in Washington, D.C.
Houses completed in 1909